Mar Joseph Pallikaparambil is a bishop of Syro-Malabar Catholic Church and the current Bishop Emeritus of Pala, Kottayam, India. He was the Second Bishop of Palai after Bishop Sebastian Vayalil.

On 18 March 2004, Joseph Kallarangatt was appointed as the 3rd Bishop of the Syro-Malabar Catholic Eparchy of Palai, after the resignation of Bishop Pallikaparampil.

References

Bishops